Harvey Ray Hilderbran (born February 9, 1960) is an American politician and former member of the Texas House of Representatives from District 53, which included fifteen counties in central Texas. Hilderbran resides in Kerrville west of San Antonio.

Career
In 2008, the Texas Deer Association awarded Hilderbran the "Frank Madla Award for Representative of the Year", named for the late State Senator Frank L. Madla of San Antonio. Hilderbran was also named "Legislator of the Year" in 2007 by the Texas Municipal League, and was the recipient of the 2006 Distinguished Legislator Award by the Texas Recreation and Parks Society.

Hilderbran was a candidate for the Republican nomination for Texas Comptroller of Public Accounts to succeed the retiring Susan Combs, who is stepping down after two four-year terms. In the primary election for comptroller held on March 4, 2014, Hilderbran polled 317,731 (26 percent), a weak second position to State Senator Glenn Hegar of Katy, who led the field with 610,512 (50 percent). The two would have met in a May 27 runoff election, but Hildebran announced on March 7 that he was ending his campaign and endorsing Hegar as the Republican nominee. The two other candidates, Debra Medina of Wharton, an activist with the Tea Party movement, and former State Representative Raul Torres of Corpus Christi, trailed with 235,713 (19 percent) and 57,255 (5 percent), respectively.

Businessman Andrew Stevenson Murr of Junction, Texas, led the March 4 primary to succeed Hilderbran with 9,951 votes (41 percent). Robert Earl "Rob" Henneke (also born c. 1977), a Kerrville lawyer, received 7,030 (29 percent). In third place was Karen D. Harris (born c. 1969) of Kerrville with 5,840 votes (24 percent). Two others held the remaining 6 percent of the ballots cast. Andrew Murr faced the second highest vote-getter, Robert Earl "Rob" Henneke, in a May 27 runoff, winning 9,387 (60.6 percent) to 6,100 (39.4 percent). Without a Democratic Party nominee in District 53, Murr defeated the Libertarian nominee, Maximiliam Martin, 36,878 votes (89.9 percent) to 4,139 (10.1 percent) in the general election on November 4.

References

External links
 Hilderbran's Texas House of Representatives website
 Rep. Harvey Hilderbran being considered as Executive Director of Texas Parks and Wildlife
 Rep. Hilderbran pushes bill for Texas Parks
 Animal Underworld: Rep. Hilderbran's Efforts to Protect America's Black Market for Rare and Exotic Species
 Roadside snakes may breathe easier, but collectors are gasping About HB 2414 that was modified in Committee in Harvey Hilderbran
 Session sees relatively few outdoors-related bills About HB 12 by Harvey Hilderbran
 

Republican Party members of the Texas House of Representatives
1960 births
Living people
People from Kerrville, Texas
People from Uvalde, Texas
Texas Tech University alumni
American Episcopalians
Businesspeople from Texas
Ranchers from Texas
20th-century American politicians
21st-century American politicians